The Taifa of Segura was a medieval taifa Moorish kingdom which existed from 1147 to probably around 1150.

Rulers
Ibn Hamušk: 1147–?
 To Murcia: c. 1150–1172

References

1150 disestablishments
States and territories established in 1147
Segura